St Winifred's School Choir, from St Winifred's Roman Catholic Primary School in Stockport, Cheshire, England, was a choir of children whose single entitled "There's No One Quite Like Grandma" in 1980 became that year's British Christmas number one single.

Career

Formation
The choir had formed in 1968 and been recording songs since 1972, when Foley played the guitar with the choir and the conductor was Miss Olive Moore. In 1978, they were the uncredited backing vocalists on the number one hit "Matchstalk Men and Matchstalk Cats and Dogs" by Brian and Michael (actually Kevin Parrott and Michael Coleman). The single concerned the paintings of L.S. Lowry and gave the choir their first appearance on the BBC One show Top of the Pops.

"There's No One Quite Like Grandma"
Their first major single under their own name came in November 1979. During this time (in the late 1970s and the 1980s), Miss Terri Foley trained and conducted the choir. In 1980, the choir signed to Music for Pleasure, an EMI associated label also known as MFP and released "There's No One Quite Like Grandma" in time for the Christmas market. The song was written for the 80th birthday of Queen Elizabeth, the Queen Mother in 1980 by record producer Gordon Lorenz and sold one million copies, most of them Christmas presents from grandchildren. It spent two weeks at number one, and 11 weeks on the UK Singles Chart in total. It was also the only UK No. 1 single for the MFP record label.

Over the next ten years, they would release nine albums including in 1982, Christmas for Everyone; and in 1986 Children's Party Time, which included 32 arrangements of songs including ABBA's "Waterloo" and "Dancing Queen".

1990s–2000s
In 1990, St Winifred's School Choir teamed up with Ziba Banafsheh and recorded "A Better World" in aid of Mother Teresa of Calcutta's charity, for BMG's Ariola label. In 1993, they recorded the single "One Voice" with Bill Tarmey (better known as Jack Duckworth from Coronation Street), but ended up being uncredited on the release. This Barry Manilow cover would be produced by Mike Stock and Pete Waterman from 1980s hitmaking production team S/A/W and would reach number 16 on the UK Singles Chart for Tarmey (and BMG's Arista label).

In November 2009, 14 of the original choir members reunited to record a new version of "There's No One Quite Like Grandma" in association with Innocent Drinks to raise money for the Age Concern charity.

Notable members
One of the children who appeared on television in the 1980 recording was Sally Lindsay, who has gone on to become an actress, appearing in the ITV soap opera Coronation Street and the BBC sitcom The Royle Family. Another, Jennifer Hennessy, is also a television actress and has appeared in the BBC drama Doctor Who and the BBC comedy The Office.

See also
 Brian and Michael
 Claire and Friends - another group featuring St Winifred's School Choir members and a connection to Brian and Michael

References

External links
Lyrics of "There's No One Quite Like Grandma"
"St Winifred's School Choir" - Article by the BBC.
Short video clip of the song (requires RealPlayer)
Composer Gordon Lorenz
Page about the first album of Modern Hymns the choir made"

Choirs of children
Music in the Metropolitan Borough of Stockport
Musical groups established in 1968
Musical groups from Greater Manchester
English choirs